Midway Arcade Treasures is a video-game compilation of 24 arcade games, emulated from the original PCBs. The overall release was developed by Digital Eclipse and issued by Midway Games for the PlayStation 2, Xbox (not compatible with Xbox 360), GameCube, and Microsoft Windows.

Midway followed up the Arcade Treasures with successive compilations featuring different games: Midway Arcade Treasures 2 in 2004, Midway Arcade Treasures 3 in 2005, the portable Midway Arcade Treasures: Extended Play, and the Windows-exclusive Midway Arcade Treasures Deluxe Edition in 2006.

After Midway's bankruptcy, Warner Bros. owns the rights and released another arcade compilation called Midway Arcade Origins in 2012 for the PlayStation 3 and Xbox 360, which includes 29 select games from MAT 1 and 2 plus Super Off Road from 3. It also contains Vindicators Part II which replaced the original Vindicators from Midway Arcade Treasures.

The compilation was later re-released as Midway Arcade Treasures 1, the title and packaging being changed slightly to match the succeeding volumes. However, the lineup of games remained the same.

Features 
The compilation plays similarly on all three consoles; however, the Xbox version has the extra ability to upload scores to an online scoreboard. The special features on each version of the game are the same. These include game histories, developer interviews and other documents. This compilation is a combination of the games included in Williams Arcade's Greatest Hits, Midway's Greatest Arcade Hits, and Arcade Party Pak for the original PlayStation and PC and each contain exactly the same extras from those collections. Additionally, there are eleven more games included that are not found in those collections.

While the PlayStation 2 and GameCube versions can be played on the earliest models of the PlayStation 3 and Wii respectively (due to their backwards compatibility), the Xbox version is not Xbox 360 compatible.

Games

The collection consists of the following 24 arcade games:

Reception

Midway Arcade Treasures received mixed, but generally positive reviews from reviewers at GameRankings with a 75.31% of the GameCube version, 73.86% of the PlayStation 2 version, and 75.02% of the Xbox version. Criticisms are the poor menu layout, slowdown in Smash TV, for the documentaries and interviews having video quality that is grainy and unrestored, as well as the documentaries and interviews being rehashed from previous Midway collections.

Midway Arcade Treasures also received mixed and positive reviews from review aggregator Metacritic, with a score of 76 for the PlayStation 2 version, a score of 74 for the Xbox version, and the lowest being a score of 72 for the GameCube version. The reviews were mostly the same as GameRankings, stating the games positive and negative points. Many of the complaints were based on the DVD content having poor, and stuttering quality, the menu being not pleasant to look at, and some of the games being difficult to control (with Vindicators as the main point of focus). Reviewers did say the collection was worth getting, even if the games didn't entice you at first.

The compilation sold more than 1 million units by August 2005.

Similar collections

Game Center USA: Midway Arcade Treasures 
A similar collection of Midway arcade games was also released exclusively in Japan by Success under the title Game Center USA: Midway Arcade Treasures, which compiled 32 select games from the original Midway Arcade Treasures and Midway Arcade Treasures 2 was released for the PlayStation 2 on September 21, 2006.

The included games are 720°, A.P.B., Arch Rivals, Bubbles, Championship Sprint, Cyberball 2072, Gauntlet, Gauntlet II, Hard Drivin', Joust, Joust 2: Survival of the Fittest, Klax, Kozmik Krooz'r, Marble Madness, Paperboy, Pit-Fighter, Rampart, RoadBlasters, Robotron: 2084, Root Beer Tapper, Satan's Hollow, Splat!, Spy Hunter, Spy Hunter II, Super Sprint, Toobin', Total Carnage, Vindicators, Wacko, Xenophobe, and Xybots.

Midway Arcade 
In 2012, another similar collection was released: an application called Midway Arcade. Available for iOS, it is the first of the series to be published by Warner Bros. which acquired all the assets due to Midway's bankruptcy. The compilation only includes 5 games from the original Midway Arcade Treasures, Defender, Joust, Rampage, Root Beer Tapper, and Spy Hunter, as well as Arch Rivals from Midway Arcade Treasures 2.

The compilation also included four traditional arcade games: Air Hockey, Arcade Basketball (themed after Arch Rivals), Pool, and Roll Ball, a redemption center where players would purchase prizes using tickets, and a jukebox that allowed players to play music from their iTunes library.

Two packs containing three additional games were also purchasable from the App Store: the Action Game Pack contains A.P.B., NARC, and Total Carnage from Midway Arcade Treasures 2, while the Adventure Game Pack contains Gauntlet from the original Midway Arcade Treasures, as well as Gauntlet II and Wizard of Wor from Midway Arcade Treasures 2.

See also

Williams Arcade's Greatest Hits
Midway's Greatest Arcade Hits
Arcade Party Pak
Midway Arcade Origins

References

External links
Official Website

Midway Arcade Treasures at GameSpot
Midway Arcade Treasures at IGN

2003 video games
GameCube games
PlayStation 2 games
Midway video game compilations
Video games developed in the United States
Windows games
Xbox games
Digital Eclipse games
Multiplayer and single-player video games